The Bongo–Bagirmi or Sara–Bongo–Bagirmi languages are the major branch of the Central Sudanic language family with about forty languages. Principal groups include Bagirmi languages such as Naba and the Sara languages. They are spoken across CAR, Chad, South Sudan, and adjacent countries.

Languages
The Bongo–Bagirmi languages are for the most part poorly studied, and there is little agreement as to their internal classification. The table below is taken from Lionel Bender, as summarized in Blench (2000).

Bongo–Baka
Kara (= Tar Gula ?)
Sinyar (Shemya) ?
Bagirmi
Sara
Doba (Bedjond, Gor, Mango)
Kaba
Vale
Birri (likely to be closer to Kresh)
Fongoro (Formona) ?
Yulu (Yulu–Binga)

Sinyar and Fongoro may not be Bongo–Bagirmi or even Central Sudanic languages.

Classification
Boyeldieu (2006) classifies the Sara-Bongo–Bagirmi languages as follows.
Sara-Bongo-Bagirmi
Bongo
Modo, 'Beli, Baka
Western
Yulu
Core Western
Fer, Gula Koto
Gula Zura, 'Bu'bu, Gula Mere, Gula Sara
Nduga, Luto?
Sara 
Peripheral: Ndoka, Wad, Bagiro, Na, Tiye, Kulfa, Simé, 'Dem
Central: Sar, Mbay, Ngambay, 'Bedjond, Kaba P.
Others: Bulala, Beraku, Kenga, 'Barma

Boyeldieu (2006) considers the homelands (Urheimats) of the language groups to be as follows.
Proto-Sara-Bongo-Bagirmi: Bahr el Ghazal / southwestern South Sudan, by the border with easternmost Central African Republic
Proto-Western Sara-Bongo-Bagirmi: north-central extreme of the Central African Republic
Proto-Sara: south-central Chad, along the border with northwestern Central African Republic

The Bongo–Bagirmi languages in the east are closer to other Central Sudanic languages, while the Sara languages in the west have diverged more from the typical Central Sudanic typological profile due to contact with Ubangian and other languages.

Reconstruction

Plants
Proto-Sara–Bongo–Bagirmi plant names:

Fish
Proto-Sara-Bongo-Bagirmi fish names:

See also
List of Proto-Sara-Bongo-Bagirmi reconstructions (Wiktionary)

Further reading
Materials on Sara–Bongo–Bagirmi are often in French.

ADAMI P., 1981, (with Dj. DJARANGAR, J. FÉDRY, Ng. NASSITY et P. PALAYER), Lexique bediondo-français, Sarh, Centre d'Études Linguistiques-Collège Charles-Lwanga.
ANDERSEN T., 1981, A Grammar of Modo, A Preliminary Sketch, University of Aalborg (Denmark).
BLACHE J., 1964, Les poissons du bassin du Tchad et du bassin adjacent du Mayo Kebbi, Paris, ORSTOM.
BOYELDIEU P., 1987, Les langues fer ('kara') et yulu du nord centrafricain, Esquisses descriptives et lexiques, Paris, Geuthner.
BOYELDIEU P., 2000, La langue bagiro (République centrafricaine), Systématique, textes et lexique, Frankfurt am Main, Peter Lang (Schriften zur Afrikanistik/Research in African Studies, 4).
CAPRILE J.P., s.d. [1969 ?], Lexique mbaï-français, Lyon, Afrique et Langage (Document 2).
CAPRILE J.P., 1972, Études et documents sara-bongo-baguirmiens, Paris, Université René Descartes (Paris V), 2 vol.
DANAY K., MAKODE M. et al., 1986, Dictionnaire sara-kaba-na - français, Kyabe (Tchad), Sarh, Centre d'Études Linguistiques-Collège Charles-Lwanga.
DJEMADJIOUDJIEL N.L.Mb. et J. FÉDRY, 1979, Lexique ngàmbáy-français, français-ngàmbáy, Sarh, Centre d'Études Linguistiques-Collège Charles-Lwanga.
GADEN H., 1909, Essai de grammaire de la langue baguirmienne, suivi de textes et de vocabulaires baguirmien-français et français-baguirmien, Paris, E. Leroux.
KANZI-SOUSSOU C., 1985, Essai de phonologie de la langue kara de Birao, Université de Bangui (Faculté des Lettres et Sciences Humaines).
KANZI-SOUSSOU C., 1992, Le verbe en fer (kara), Étude morphologique et syntaxique du verbe dans une langue centrafricaine, Université de Paris X-Nanterre (Département de Linguistique).
KEEGAN J., 1996 (2ème éd.), (with M. NANGBAYE et B. MANADJI TOLKOM), Dictionary of Mbay, Munich-Newcastle, Lincom Europa. [1ère éd. 1993, chez l'auteur]
KILPATRICK E., 1985, Bongo Phonology, Occasional Papers in the Study of Sudanese Languages, 4, 1-62.
MALBRANT R., 1952 (2ème éd.), Faune du Centre Africain français (Mammifères et Oiseaux), Paris, Lechevalier (Encyclopédie Biologique XV).
NDOKO B.R., 1991, Esquisse phonologique du lútò, Université de Bangui (Faculté des Lettres et Sciences Humaines).
NOUGAYROL P., 1999, Les parlers gula (Centrafrique, Soudan, Tchad), Grammaire et lexique, Paris, CNRS Éditions.
PALAYER P., 1970, (with M. FOURNIER et E. MOUNDO), Éléments de grammaire sar (Tchad), Lyon-Fort-Archambault, Afrique et Langage-Collège Charles Lwanga (Études linguistiques 2).
PALAYER P., 1989, La langue sar (sud du Tchad), Tours, Université de Tours, 2 vol.
PALAYER P., 1992, Dictionnaire Sar-Français (Tchad), Paris, Geuthner.
PALAYER P., 2004, (with A. GOUDJA KODNGARGUE et Ch. VANDAME), Dictionnaire kenga, Louvain-Paris, Peeters (A&L 6).
PALAYER P., 2006, (with M. SOLEKAYE), Dictionnaire démé (Tchad). Précédé de notes grammaticales, Louvain-Paris, Peeters (A&L 10).
PARKER K., 1985, Baka Phonology, Occasional Papers in the Study of Sudanese Languages, 4, 63-85.
PERSSON A.M. et J.R. PERSSON, 1991, Modo-English Dictionary with Grammar, Nairobi, SIL.
SAMPSON D.L., 1997, Update on Baka Phonology and Orthography, as of 1996, Occasional Papers in the Study of Sudanese Languages, 7, 114-120.
SANTANDREA St., 1963, A Concise Grammar Outline of the Bongo language, Rome, Sodality of St. Peter Claver.
SAXON Douglas E., 1980, The History of the Shari River Basin ca. 500 B.C.-1000 A.D., Los Angeles, University of California.
SCHWEINFURTH G., 1873, Linguistische Ergebnisse einer Reise nach Centralafrika, Supplément à Zeitschrift für Ethnologie (1872), Berlin, Wiegandt et Hempel.
SCHWEINFURTH G., 1875, Au coeur de l'Afrique, 1868-1871, Voyages et découvertes dans les régions inexplorées de l'Afrique centrale, Paris, Hachette, tome 1.
STEVENSON R.C., 1969, Bagirmi Grammar, University of Khartoum (Linguistic Monograph Series 3).
VANDAME Ch., 1968, Grammaire kenga, Lyon, Afrique et Langage (Études linguistiques 2).

Unpublished manuscripts
BOYELDIEU P., Lexique 'barma (baguirmien).
BOYELDIEU P., Lexique kaba de Paoua.
BOYELDIEU P., Lexique yulu.
FÉDRY J., Questionnaire d'Inventaire Linguistique : kulfa.
FÉDRY J., Questionnaire d'Inventaire Linguistique : 'dem.
FÉDRY J., Questionnaire d'Inventaire Linguistique : tiye.
NOUGAYROL P., Lexique bongo.
NOUGAYROL P., Lexique ndoka.
NOUGAYROL P., Lexique nduga.
NOUGAYROL P., Note sur le wada.

References

Boyeldieu, Pascal. 2006. Présentation des langues Sara-Bongo-Baguirmiennes. Paris: CNRS-LLACAN (online version). (PDF)
Blench (2000)

External links
Sara-Bagirmi Language Project, more detailed description of Sara-Bagirmi Languages (old version)
List of Proto-Sara–Bongo–Bagirmi reconstructions
Proto-Sara-Bongo-Bagirmi Swadesh list (Boyeldieu)

Languages of Chad
Languages of the Central African Republic
Languages of South Sudan